Arrowhead Marsh is a wetlands habitat made of tidal mud flats in Martin Luther King, Jr. Shoreline in Oakland, California. It is an important stop on the Pacific flyway and is habitat for important endangered species especially the Salt Marsh Harvest Mouse.

See also

Damon Marsh

References

Landforms of Alameda County, California
Wetlands of the San Francisco Bay Area
Marshes of California